Eldon is an unincorporated community in Mason County, Washington, United States.  Eldon is located along U.S. Route 101 on the scenic Hood Canal.  Eldon features a small store and several recreational areas and businesses catering to travellers and locals.

Eldon is also known as Hamma Hamma, which is technically slightly to the south, but is for all intents regarded as the same area.

References

Unincorporated communities in Washington (state)
Unincorporated communities in Mason County, Washington